Hennies is a surname. Notable people with the surname include:

 Don Hennies (born 1937), American politician
 Sarah Hennies (born 1979), American composer and percussionist
 Tom Hennies (1939–2009), American police officer and politician, brother of Don

German-language surnames
Dutch-language surnames